Jung-hwa or Jeong-hwa, also spelled Jong-hwa in North Korea, is a Korean unisex given name. Its meaning depends on the hanja used to write each syllable of the name. There are 75 hanja with the reading "jung" and five hanja with the reading "hwa" on the South Korean government's official list of hanja which may be registered for use in given names.

People with this name include:

Entertainers
Uhm Jung-hwa (born 1969), South Korean actress and singer
Kim Jung-hwa (born 1983), South Korean actress and model 
J.Fla (born Kim Jung-hwa, 1987), South Korean female singer and YouTuber
Park Jeong-hwa (born 1995), South Korean singer and actress, member of girl group EXID

Sportspeople
Lee Jeong-hwa (born 1957), South Korean female sport shooter
Hyun Jung-hwa (born 1969), South Korean female table tennis player  
An Jung-hwa (born 1981), South Korean female handball player 
Han Jung-hwa (born 1982), South Korean male football midfielder
Im Jyoung-hwa (born 1987), South Korean female weightlifter
Ri Jong-hwa (born 1990), North Korean female weightlifter
Seo Jung-hwa (born 1990), South Korean female freestyle skier

Other
Choi Jeong Hwa (born 1961), South Korean male sculptor
Won Jeong-hwa (born 1974), North Korean female spy

See also
List of Korean given names

References

Korean unisex given names